Hermenegildo García (born 11 September 1968) is a Cuban fencer. He won a silver medal in the team foil event at the 1992 Summer Olympics.

References

1968 births
Living people
Cuban male fencers
Olympic fencers of Cuba
Fencers at the 1992 Summer Olympics
Olympic silver medalists for Cuba
Olympic medalists in fencing
Medalists at the 1992 Summer Olympics
20th-century Cuban people
21st-century Cuban people